Parerupa is a genus of moths of the family Crambidae.

Species
Parerupa africana (Aurivillius, 1910)
Parerupa bipunctalis (Hampson, 1919)
Parerupa distictalis (Hampson, 1919)
Parerupa undilinealis (Hampson, 1919)

References

Natural History Museum Lepidoptera genus database

Crambinae
Crambidae genera
Taxa named by George Hampson